The year 1994 was the 23rd year after the independence of Bangladesh. It was the fourth year of the first term of the government of Khaleda Zia. The year was characterized by the continuous boycott of parliament by the opposition parties over the demand of a neutral Caretaker Government to oversee future elections.

Incumbents

 President: Abdur Rahman Biswas
 Prime Minister: Khaleda Zia
 Chief Justice: Shahabuddin Ahmed

Demography

Climate

Cyclone
As a result of the early warning and subsequent evacuation of about 450,000 people, the loss of life was minimal. According to official estimates 133 (including 84 refugees) died and 3,559 were injured.

Economy

Note: For the year 1994 average official exchange rate for BDT was 40.21 per US$.

Events
 20 March – BNP won the by-polls to Magura-2 parliamentary constituency, which had fallen vacant following the Awami League MP's death; but the victory was tainted with allegation of widespread rigging – which eventually strengthened the oppositions claim for a Caretaker Government to oversee future elections.
 6 September – The Dhanmondi residence of the founding father and President of Bangladesh Sheikh Mujibur Rahman was handed over to Bangabandhu Memorial Trust to turn it into a museum.

Awards and recognitions

International Recognition
 Dr. Muhammad Yunus wins the World Food Prize

Independence Day Award

Ekushey Padak
Sarder Jayenuddin (literature)
Humayun Ahmed (literature)
Ali Monsur (drama)
Abu Taher (fine arts)
Nina Hamid (vocal music)
Shahadat Hossain Khan (instrumental music)
Mohammad Noman (education)
Hasanuzzaman Khan (journalism)

Sports
 Asian Games:
 Bangladesh participated in the 1994 Asian Games which were held from 2 to 16 October 1994 in Hiroshima, Japan. Bangladesh national kabaddi team won the only silver medal for the country in their event in the tournament. The other noticeable achievement in the tournament was that Bangladesh ranked 7th in the field hockey.
 Domestic football:
 Abahani KC won Dhaka League title while Muktijoddha SKC became runner-up.
 Muktijoddha SKC also won Bangladesh Federation Cup title.

Births
 2 February – Shukhtara Rahman, cricketer
 5 April – Shamoli Ray, archer
 16 September – Yeasin Khan, footballer
 13 October – Liton Das, cricketer

Deaths

 21 May – Mohammad Nasiruddin, journalist (b. 1888)
 28 May – Ashab Uddin Ahmad, author (b. 1914)
 30 May – Mafiz Ali Chowdhury, politician (b, 1919)
 26 June – Jahanara Imam, writer and activist (b. 1929)
 10 October – SM Sultan, painter (b, 1923)

See also 
 1990s in Bangladesh
 List of Bangladeshi films of 1994
 Timeline of Bangladeshi history

References